Pauline Irene Nguene is a Cameroonian-born Petroleum Engineer. She is currently the Cameroon Minister of Social Affairs.

Early life 
Mrs. NGUENE hails from Minka village (Makak) in the Nyong-et-Kellé Division, Centre Region, of the Republic of Cameroon. She is holder of a Bachelor of Sciences in petroleum engineering  from the New-Mexico Institute of Mining and Technology in the United States of America. She completed her training by obtaining a post-graduate diploma (“maîtrise”/ Master) in earth sciences from the University of Yaounde. She later obtained a Specialised Graduate Diplomas in oil companies management at HEC Montréal.

Studies 
1-New-Mexico Institute of Mining and Technology in the United States of America: Bachelor of Sciences in petroleum engineering ;
2-University of Yaounde: post-graduate diploma (“maîtrise”/Master) in earth sciences ;
3-Higher Commercial Studies (HEC) - Montréal in Canada: Specialised Graduate Diplomas in oil companies management ;

Career 
She returned to Cameroon in 1983. A few years later, she was appointed Service Head for Hydrocarbons Exploration in the Ministry of Mines, Water Resources and Energy. While working for this Ministry, she completed her training in engineering at the University of Yaounde where she obtained a post-graduate diploma (“maîtrise”) in earth sciences.
Having obtained a scholarship of ACDI (Canada) to study in the School of Higher Commercial Studies in Montréal, she obtained a Specialised Graduate Diplomas  in oil companies management in that institution in 1988.
From 1991 to 2009, Mrs. NGUENE successively occupied the following posts in the Prime Minister’s Office:
 Attaché (1991-1992);
 Chargé de Mission (1992-2001);
 Technical  Adviser (2001-2009).
On 13 January 2009, she was appointed by Presidential Decree Chairperson of the SUPPORT BOARD FOR THE REALIZATION OF PARTNERSHIP CONTRACTS (CARPA), an institution in charge of implementing Public-Private Partnerships (PPP) in Cameroon. 
On 2 October 2015, she was appointed MINISTER OF SOCIAL AFFAIRS.
Since 2016, Mrs. NGUENE is equally the Chairperson of the Board of Directors of the Cardinal Paul Emile LEGER National Centre for the Rehabilitation of Persons with Disabilities (CNRPH-CPEL).

Some Big Projects of the Ministry of Social Affairs 
-The rehabilitation and modernization of the Cameroon Child Institute (l'institution Camerounaise de l'Enfance (ICE)) of Betamba in Ntui (Centre Region);
-The construction of the Rehabilitation Centre for Persons with Disabilities (CRPH) in Maroua (Far North Region);
-The fight against social exclusion and the implementation of social entrepreneurship;
-The putting in place of a Unified Social Register (a cartography of socially vulnerable persons);
-The modernization of the Cardinal Paul Emile LEGER National Centre for the Rehabilitation of Persons with Disabilities (CNRPH-CPEL).

Honorific Distinction 
Grand Officer of the Order of Valour (2019).

References 

21st-century Cameroonian women politicians
21st-century Cameroonian politicians
Living people
Cameroon People's Democratic Movement politicians
Year of birth missing (living people)